Phu Bon was a province of South Vietnam. In September 1962, the government of the Republic of Vietnam divided Pleiku province into two provinces: Pleiku and Phu Bon. In 1976, the province was imported into Dak Lak province, then most of the area was imported to Gia Lai province and Kon Tum province. The province was a location in the Central Highlands Campaign

References 

Former provinces of Vietnam
1976 disestablishments in Vietnam